F-Man is a 1936 American comedy film directed by Edward F. Cline and written by Richard Connell, Henry Johnson, Paul Gerard Smith and Eddie Welch. The film stars Jack Haley, William Frawley, Grace Bradley, Adrienne Marden, Onslow Stevens and Franklin Parker. The film was released on May 2, 1936, by Paramount Pictures.

Plot

Johnny Dime goes to California determined to become a government agent. He ends up a soda jerk instead, then lies to sweetheart Molly Carter when she follows him west, claiming he is working undercover.

Hogan, a detective, can't help him become a "G-Man" so he bestows a fake title, F-Man, on the gullible Johnny. He becomes annoyed when Johnny accidentally interferes with his own undercover operation, trying to bring gangster Shaw to justice. Johnny ends up getting himself shot and wounded, but apprehends Shaw with a fake gun and becomes a hero by sheer luck.

Cast 
Jack Haley as Johnny Dime
William Frawley as Detective Hogan
Grace Bradley as Evelyn
Adrienne Marden as Molly Carter
Onslow Stevens as Mr. Shaw
Franklin Parker as Craig
Norman Willis as Jerry
Edward McWade as Mr. Whitney
Robert Middlemass as Chief Cartwright
Walter Johnson as Dougherty
Spencer Charters as Sheriff Hank 'One Gun' Groder
Billy Gilbert (uncredited)

References

External links 
 

1936 films
Paramount Pictures films
American comedy films
1936 comedy films
Films directed by Edward F. Cline
American black-and-white films
1930s English-language films
1930s American films